Mwembeshi is a constituency of the National Assembly of Zambia. It covers Muteli and Nampundwe in Shibuyunji District of Central Province.

List of MPs

References

Constituencies of the National Assembly of Zambia
Constituencies established in 1991
1991 establishments in Zambia